Sword Dynasty  is 2019 Chinese costume wuxia live-action streaming television series based on the novel of the same name by Wu Zui. Directed by Jones Wah-Kon Ma starring Li Xian and Li Yitong airs on iQiyi starting December 6, 2019. The series tells the story of Ding Ning (Li Xian), a mysterious city wine shop boy, who has gone through all kinds of hardships to counterattack with a sword and chose "Daiyi" to grow up in distress.

Synopsis 
Based on the context of the Warring States period in China, when Heng, the most powerful in the seven states, is on the conquest of unification. To seek revenge on the King of Heng, a young man named Ding Ning (Li Xian)  plans to kill the King of Heng for his master Liang Jingmeng 10 years ago. In order to conceal himself from the King, he and his companion, Zhansun Qianxue (Li Yitong); disguise themselves as family. However, it is revealed that Ding Ning was a reincarnation of Liang Jingmeng through his cultivation technique Nine Deathsilk Worm. The King of Heng sacrificed the Battle Burial Field as he recognized these warriors a potential threat to his seat on the throne.

Cast 
Li Xian as Ding Ning
Li Yitong as Zhangsun Qianxue
Liu Yijun as Emperor Xuan Wu
Yao Di as Empress Zheng Xiu 
Peter Ho as Liang Jing Meng as Leader of Bashan Sword Field Sect and Nine-Death Silkworm Art User
Zhao Yuanyuan as Ye Ce Leng (Grand Astrologer),  Disciple of Liang Jing Meng
Liu Lu as Zhao Si
Ni Xinyu 
Yao Jingren as Li Xiang
Xiao Xun as Xie Changsheng
Zhang Weina as Bai Shanshui (Lady of Yun Shui Palace)
Liu Kai as Zhang Yi
Liu Hailan as Xie Rou
Sun Shaolong as Su Qing of White Ram Cave
Wang Ge as Zhu Yuan
Zong Feng Yan as Ba Li Xue (Leader/Swordmaster of Min Shan Sect)
Li Guang Fu as Xue Wang Xu  (Leader/Cave master of White Ram)
Wang Zhuocheng as Feng Qinghan

Production
iQiyi first adapted the novel by Wu Zui into an animated series which premiered on April 26, 2017. The production staff for the live-action series was announced in November 2017, with Feng Xiaogang as executive producer, Jones Wah-Kon Ma as the main director, Rao Jun as the main screenwriter and To-hoi Kong as the stunt coordinator. Co-producing the series alongside iQiyi is Beijing Xinliliang Entertainment and  Beijing Shengji Entertainment. One month before the shoot, Li entered the group one month in advance and followed the action team to practice sword moves.

The series was filmed from December 2017 to April 2018 at Hengdian World Studios.

Design
The clothing designed based on each of the characters, the male and female lead; Ding Ning and Qingxue's linen dress reflect the simplicity of the children of the rivers and lakes, while the black and golden kimono of the king and the red gorgeous palace of the queen represents the luxury and majesty of the peak of power. In addition, the martial arts such as "Moving Mountain", "Freehand Fragment", "Shendan Blood Talisman" in the play are also set with romantic and mysterious artistic imagination, and both realistic and freehand in aesthetic creation. Tonal, collide with a unique historical and cultural atmosphere. As the producer Feng Xiaogang shared at the meeting, he hoped that the style of costumed martial arts could be integrated with the aesthetics of modern young audiences to create an aesthetic style that is both cultural and acceptable to young audiences.

Accolades

References

External links
 
 

Chinese wuxia television series
2019 Chinese television series debuts
IQIYI original programming
Chinese web series
Television shows based on Chinese novels
Television series by iQiyi Pictures
2020 Chinese television series endings